V was a Finnish free-of-charge magazine launched in 2006 aimed at the young adult generation of 20- to 30-year-olds. Its content was mostly similar to other similar magazines such as City, Nöjesguiden and Metropoli. Because of low popularity, V was discontinued in 2007 as a separate magazine and incorporated into Metro.

References

2006 establishments in Finland
2007 disestablishments in Finland
Defunct magazines published in Finland
Free magazines
Finnish-language magazines
Magazines established in 2006
Magazines disestablished in 2007